Pine Grove is a neighbourhood  of Vaughan, Ontario, Canada, in York Region. Originally a hamlet north of Woodbridge, it is now an enclave within that larger neighbourhood.

History
The lands located on the east half of lots 9, 10 and 11 of concession 7 were first patented to David Thompson on May 20, 1801. By 1830, it was a well settled community. John Smith (Schmidt), a farmer from Edgeley, came to Pine Grove where he erected a grist mill and saw mill in 1828. In 1831 he built a store. In 1840 John Smith sold the mill to John W. Gamble who later became the first reeve of Vaughan Township. The mill was sold to Gooderham and Worts in 1860. By the time of Confederation, Pine Grove was home to a flour mill, churches, three hotels, a blacksmith shop, harness shops, a spool factory, one common school and a large general store with a post office. A stage coach ran daily to Weston.

On October 15, 1954, Pine Grove was hit by Hurricane Hazel. The flooding of the village along Islington Avenue destroyed several buildings and the Mill Dam. Up to 2008, it was the last operating mill on the Humber River, operated by the Hayhoe family who purchased the mill from Fred Hicks on June 1, 1935. Harold Hayhoe on June 1, 1935 bought Hicks Flour Mills and renamed it Hayhoe Bros.. He became the seventh owner of the mill dating back to 1828 and he paid more for the land that came with the business than the mill itself. Freshly graduated from the University of Toronto, Engineering, he took the advice of his father in the middle of the Depression and "got in the food business". Harold's brother Edwin joined him shortly after and a third brother Boyce came in 1939. For years the Hayhoe Bros. operated the mill in Pine Grove and built it into an efficient wheat milling business. Harold's son, John Hayhoe joined the company in 1964, one year after graduating from the University of Western Ontario with an MBA. In 1964 Harold Hayhoe bought out his two brothers Edwin and Boyce. In May 1968, Hayhoe Bros. became Hayhoe Mills Ltd.

Don Hayhoe, another son of Harold's, also joined the company in 1965 and together Harold and his two sons operated the business until 1985, when Harold Hayhoe retired. Harold Hayhoe, often regarded as a true milling pioneer, died December 30, 1987. Don Hayhoe left the business in 1994 when John Harold Hayhoe, who had built the milling business into significant Ontario marketshare, bought him out. John Hayhoe owned the business until 1998 when ownership succeeded to his sons. Mark, Greg and Dean Hayhoe continued to own and operate Hayhoe Mills Limited until March 2007 when the mill was sold to New Life Mills, a division of Parrish and Heimbecker Limited. John Hayhoe, after a battle with Parkinson's disease died on June 20, 2007; the same day the transition of the mill to the new owners was complete.

On July 1, 2008, a large fire broke out in Hayhoe Mills and, for the first time in 180 years, the sound of grinding grain could not be heard from the mill on the Humber.

As of January 31, 2015, the area where Hayhoe Mills stood is scheduled to be converted into townhouses.  The mill along with neighbouring homes have been demolished and townhomes are to be built in its place as well as across the street.

Neighbourhoods in Vaughan